The 27th Iowa Infantry Regiment was an infantry regiment that served in the Union Army during the American Civil War.

Service
The 27th Iowa Infantry was organized at Dubuque, Iowa and mustered in for three years of Federal service  on October 3, 1862.  As soon as it was mustered in the Regiment was sent north to help deal with the Sioux uprising in Minnesota.  Iowa was in the Army's newly formed Department of the Northwest commanded Major General John Pope at  Fort Snelling.  

The regiment was mustered out on August 8, 1865.

Total strength and casualties
A total of  1172 men served in the 27th Iowa at one time or another during its existence.
It suffered 1 officer and 23 enlisted men who were killed in action or who died of their wounds and 2 officers and 167 enlisted men who died of disease, for a total of 193 fatalities.

Commanders
 Colonel James I. Gilbert
 Lieutenant Colonel Jed Lake

See also
List of Iowa Civil War Units
Iowa in the American Civil War

Notes

References
The Civil War Archive

Units and formations of the Union Army from Iowa
Military units and formations established in 1862
1862 establishments in Iowa
Military units and formations disestablished in 1865